Jeremy Edward Nirina Ebobisse Ebolo (born February 14, 1997) is an American professional soccer player who plays as a striker for Major League Soccer club San Jose Earthquakes and the United States national team.

Youth and amateur

Born in Paris, France, Jeremy Ebobisse moved with his family to Bethesda, Maryland at the age of two. He attended Walter Johnson High School, where he played alongside Gedion Zelalem and they were coached by Michael Williams. In his freshman year, Walter Johnson had an undefeated regular season and reached the state championship game where they were upset by Bowie High School. Ebobisse and Zelalem starred for this impressive squad with both receiving individual honors at the conclusion of the season.

Outside of high school, he played club soccer the OBGC Rangers which also would go on to produce several other professional players including Zelalem, Carter Manley, Chase Gasper, and Jake Rozhansky.  Ebobisse played two years of college soccer at Duke University in 2014 and 2015, where he scored 9 goals in 37 appearances. While at college, Ebobisse appeared with Premier Development League side D.C. United U-23 in 2015.

Professional career 
Ebobisse signed a contract with Major League Soccer in August 2016, but without a club until the 2017 MLS SuperDraft in January 2017. He spent time with United Soccer League side Charleston Battery towards the end of their 2016 season. Jeremy was drafted fourth overall in the 2017 MLS SuperDraft by the Portland Timbers, following a deal with the Houston Dynamo for an international slot, $100,000 in general allocation money, and the tenth draft pick.

Ebobisse enjoyed a breakout in the second half of the 2018 MLS season, starting in all six of the Timbers' playoff appearances. He went on to start in the MLS Cup 2018 final against Atlanta United FC.

In August 2021, he was traded by Portland to San Jose. During week two of the 2023 season, Ebobisse was named to the league's Team of the Matchday after tallying a goal and an assist in San Jose's 2–1 victory over the Vancouver Whitecaps.

International
Ebobisse was born in France and is of Cameroonian and Malagasy descent. He moved to the United States at a young age, and chose to represent the US internationally. Ebobisse played with the United States under-20 national team during the 2017 FIFA U-20 World Cup.

Ebobisse earned his first call up for the United States senior team as a part of the 2019 January camp. He made his debut for the United States national team on January 27, 2019 in a friendly against Panama, as a starter.
On October 31, 2019, Ebobisse was called into the U.S. Mens national team pre-camp in, Bradenton, Fla.

Personal life
Ebobisse's older brother, Patrick, played college soccer at Williams College in Massachusetts.

Career statistics

Club

Honors 
Portland Timbers
MLS is Back Tournament: 2020

United States U20
CONCACAF Under-20 Championship: 2017

References

External links
Duke Website
Portland Timbers Website

 

1997 births
Living people
American soccer players
American people of Cameroonian descent
American people of Malagasy descent
Association football forwards
Charleston Battery players
D.C. United U-23 players
Duke Blue Devils men's soccer players
Footballers from Paris
French footballers
French sportspeople of Cameroonian descent
French sportspeople of Malagasy descent
French emigrants to the United States
Major League Soccer players
People from Bethesda, Maryland
Portland Timbers draft picks
Portland Timbers players
Portland Timbers 2 players
San Jose Earthquakes players
Soccer players from Maryland
USL Championship players
United States men's under-20 international soccer players
USL League Two players
United States men's international soccer players
United States men's under-23 international soccer players